The Schulich School of Business is the business school of York University located in Toronto, Ontario, Canada. The institution provides undergraduate and graduate degree and diploma programs in business administration, finance, accounting, business analytics, public administration and international business as well as a number of PhD and executive programs. Originally known as the Faculty of Administrative Studies (FAS), it was renamed in 1995 after Seymour Schulich, a major benefactor who has donated $15 million to the school. The Dean of the School, Detlev Zwick, was appointed in 2021 after having served as Interim Dean for 15 months.

Primarily located at the Seymour Schulich Building on the Keele Campus in Toronto, Ontario, the school also maintains an executive education centre in Toronto's Financial District in downtown Toronto and satellite campuses in Hyderabad, India and Beijing, China. The school also has satellite centres in Shanghai, Mumbai, Seoul, São Paulo, and Mexico City. Schulich offers undergraduate, graduate and postgraduate business degrees that lead to careers in the private, public and nonprofit sectors, and has more than 34,000 alumni working in approximately 90 countries. Schulich pioneered Canada’s first International MBA (IMBA) and International BBA (iBBA) degrees, as well as North America’s first cross-border executive MBA degree, the Kellogg-Schulich Executive MBA. Schulich’s Executive Education Centre provides executive development programs annually to more than 16,000 executives in Canada and abroad.

History
The Schulich School of Business was known as the Faculty of Administrative Studies which was founded in 1966. Before the establishment of the Seymour Schulich Building on the Keele Campus in 2003, the school was run from a York University building, currently renamed as Health, Nursing & Environmental Studies Building. In 1995, following a major monetary donation from Canadian billionaire Seymour Schulich, the school underwent a series of changes that created the present-day Schulich School of Business.

Campuses

Seymour Schulich Building

The Seymour Schulich Building opened in August 2003 and cost $102 million. The building was jointly designed by Siamak Hariri and Robbie Young + Wright Architectural and was awarded the Governor General's Medal in Architecture in 2006. The Seymour Schulich Building and its Executive Learning Centre houses the Peter F. Bronfman Business Library, Executive Dining Room, Robert R. McEwen Auditorium, York Entrepreneurship Development Institute, Tuchner's Pub & Eatery, Starbucks, the central courtyard, the Executive Learning Centre hotel, and a number of small lecture halls.

In December 2017, the $120 million York University Station opened directly across from the Seymour Schulich Building’s main entrance. Designed by Foster + Partners, the station design considers the surrounding public space and connections to the city, and uses natural light to intuitively guide passengers from the entrance down to the platforms. With the Line 1 Yonge–University subway running underneath a lecture hall on Schulich’s East Wing, in 2021, Metrolinx conducted a study to analyse the latest sound and vibration technology that was used to plan and design the Yonge North Subway Extension.

Rob and Cheryl McEwen Graduate Study & Research Building 
The Rob and Cheryl McEwen Graduate Study & Research Building opened in 2019 – attributed to an $8 million donation from the McEwen family. The 67,000 square-foot facility –  which cost $50 million to build and which was designed by the firm Baird Sampson Neuert Architects –  is one of the most environmentally sustainable academic buildings in North America. The building has won a number of awards for design excellence and has received LEED Gold certification – one of the highest standards of sustainability for a building. Centered around a generously proportioned atrium—which will serve as a communal space—the building also houses a Seattle's Best Coffee café, a student marketplace, and a fitness & wellness centre, as well as a landscaped outdoor courtyard.

Miles S. Nadal Management Centre
Management programs are held in downtown Toronto at the Miles S. Nadal Management Centre which is located at 222 Bay Street in the Toronto-Dominion Centre.

India Campus
In 2014, Schulich opened a $100 million satellite campus in Hyderabad, India, a collaboration with the GMR School of Business. The campus gives students the opportunity to complete their India MBA consisting of a first year spent in India followed by a second year in Toronto.

Graduate programs
The Schulich School of Business offers a number of graduate degree programs:
PhD - Doctor of Philosophy in Business Administration
MBA - Master of Business Administration 
IMBA - International MBA with a strong emphasis on International Business
EMBA - Executive MBA program with the Kellogg School of Management at Northwestern University
India MBA - MBA program at the Schulich GMR Campus in India
MBA/J.D. - MBA with a Juris Doctor in partnership with the Osgoode Hall Law School at York University
MBA/MFA/MA - Master of Business Administration, Master of Fine Arts, and Master of Arts
MAcc - Master of Accounting
MMAI - Master of Management in Artificial Intelligence
MBAN - Master of Business Analytics
MF - Master of Finance
MMgt - Master of Management
MMKG - Master of Marketing
MREI - Master of Real Estate and Infrastructure 
MSCM - Master of Supply Chain Management

The Schulich School also offers two Graduate diploma programs:

Post MBA, Advanced Management
Intermediate Accounting
The School currently offers 17 specializations within the MBA curriculum as well as part-time and accelerated degree options.

Undergraduate programs

Overview
Schulich offers two undergraduate programs:
BBA (Hons) - Bachelor of Business Administration with Honours
iBBA (Hons) - International Bachelor of Business Administration with Honours

Admissions
Students applying to the BBA/iBBA program must have at least a low 90s high school average. There are two parts of the application process. For the first part, applicants must submit a Supplementary Information Form that includes a summary of the organizations, sports teams, volunteer or paid work that the applicant has been involved in. Secondly, there are three video interview questions along with a five-minute written portion.

The BBA and iBBA programs together enrol around 400 students (300 for BBA and 100 for iBBA) from an average of 4,500 to 5,000 applicants per year, providing an applicant to place ratio of around 12 to 1. Delayed entry students who have studied one year at another school are also allowed to apply. However, there are only a limited number of spaces reserved for the delayed entry stream and prospective applicants must meet specific degree requirements to qualify.

Academics
Similar to the graduate program, students are not required to specialize in a discipline. However, students can choose to specialize in up to two areas such as: Accounting, Economics, Entrepreneurship and Family Business, Finance, International Business, Marketing, Organization Studies, Operations Management & Information Systems, and Strategic Management. iBBA students are also required to complete one semester of study abroad at one of Schulich's partner schools and to take a foreign language course every year.

Undergraduate students in the BBA and iBBA programs also have the option of pursuing a Certificate in Managing International Trade and Investment.

International exchange
Any student enrolled in the BBA/iBBA program may apply for one Study Abroad term. Students may apply for a full academic year only in cases where a full year option is available as per the information on individual partner schools. Exchange term could either be the second semester of Year 3, or first and second semester of Year 4. Schulich partners with 64 exchange partner universities in 30 different countries. Exchange partners include Esade Business School, HEC Paris, and the National University of Singapore. Exchange is mandatory for iBBA students as it is a part of their graduation requirements, but BBA students are also allowed to participate in exchange. Most countries that invite Schulich students for exchange terms have limited spots; therefore, a portion of the spots in each university is reserved for iBBA students, and the rest of the spots are for students studying in either undergraduate designation. Select undergraduate students also have the option of completing a joint degree with the Guanghua School of Management at Peking University. Students who graduate from the Schulich-Guanghua joint program receive both a Bachelor of Business Administration (BBA or iBBA) from the Schulich School of Business and a Bachelor of Arts in Management from the Guanghua School of Management.

Rankings
Schulich has placed in national and international business school rankings. On a worldwide scale, it was ranked 83rd and 21st respectively for its MBA program by QS and The Economist, and 101-125th and 84th respectively for its business school by THE and USNWR, while additionally placing in a number of specialized rankings. 

1st in Canada and 9th International Business School by Forbes.
1st in Canada and 17th in Global MBA rankings by CNN Expansión.
1st in Canada and 7th in the world in the Corporate Knights ranking of the top MBA programs integrating social, ethical and environmental impact management issues into the curriculum.
1st in Canada and 46th in worldwide Executive MBAs (The Kellogg-Schulich Executive MBA) by the Financial Times.
2nd in the world in the 2011-2012 ranking of the top 100 MBA programs incorporating social and environmental leadership into the main curriculum, conducted by the Aspen Institute.
8th in Maclean's ranking of Canadian business schools.

Canadian MBA Alliance 
The school is also a founding member of the Canadian MBA Alliance which was created in 2013. All six members of the alliance rank among the world’s top 100 schools, according to their participation in key rankings – Financial Times, Business Week, and The Economist.

Notable faculty

 Dezsö Horvath, CM, Dean Emeritus, Dean from 1988 to 2020 and 2004 Academy of International Business "Dean of the Year"
 James Gillies, First dean of York University's Faculty of Administrative Studies, now named the Schulich School of Business
 James Fleck, Former associate dean and MBA program director
 Gareth Morgan, Pioneer in the field of organizational behavior and change management. Co-creator of the Burrell Morgan framework
Markus Giesler, Schulich Marketing Professor, named one of the 40 best business school professors under the age of 40 in the world
Russell Belk, Professor of Marketing, inducted into the Order of Canada in 2017. World-leading expert on consumer culture, consumption and the self.
Robert Phillips, George R. Gardiner Professor in Business Ethics
Ellen Auster, Professor of Strategic Management
Stephen E. Weiss, Professor of Policy and International Business

Notable alumni

 Janice Fukakusa, Former CFO of RBC and Chancellor of Ryerson University
 Daniel Dale, fact-checker for CNN, formerly Washington bureau chief of the Toronto Star
 Sheelagh Whittaker, Canadian business executive and author, The first female CEO of a TSX listed company, Former partner at the Boston Consulting Group
 Bharat Masrani, Group President and CEO of TD Bank Group
 Rob McEwen, Chairman and CEO of US Gold Corporation and Lexam Explorations, Founder and former chairman and CEO of Goldcorp
 Richard E. Waugh, President and CEO of Scotiabank
 Craig Kielburger, Founder of Free The Children
 David Wilson, Chairman of the Ontario Securities Commission
 Edmund Ho, First Chief Executive of the Macau Special Administrative Region, Current Vice-Chairman of the Chinese People's Political Consultative Conference
 Kathleen Taylor, President and CEO of Four Seasons Hotels, Chair Designate of Royal Bank of Canada
 Neelam Verma, Finalist at Miss Universe & Television Anchor
 Ronald Klaas Otto Kers, Dutch businessman and former CEO of Müller
 Bonnie Crombie, Mayor of Mississauga, Ontario
 Kim Parlee, VP of Wealth Management at TD Canada Trust and host of Business News Network's MoneyTalk
 Eileen de Villa, physician and Medical Officer of Health for the City of Toronto
 John Hunkin, Former President and CEO of CIBC, Former President of Investment and Corporate Banking Wood Gundy, Former President of Investment and Corporate Banking CIBC World Markets
 Omar Alghabra, Federal Minister of Transport
 Ellis Jacob, President and CEO of Cineplex Inc
 Helena Jaczek, Minister of Federal Economic Development Agency for Southern Ontario
 Tony Staffieri, President & CEO, Rogers Communications and Director at MLSE
 Michael Rousseau, President and CEO of Air Canada
 William Andrew Dimma, Former President of Torstar Corporation, Former President and CEO of Royal LePage, Chairman of Great Canadian Gaming
 Stephen Hudson, CEO of ECN Capital
 Joel H. Cohen, Producer and writer for Saturday Night Live, Suddenly Susan and The Simpsons
 Robert J. Gemmell, Director at Rogers Communications and Former President and CEO of Citigroup Global Markets Canada Inc.
 Denise Pickett, Director at Telus, Former President and Chief Executive Officer of Amex Bank of Canada and Former Director at HBC
 Frank M. Vettese, Director, RBC Board and Retired Managing Partner & CEO of Deloitte Canada
 Andrew Prozes, Former CEO of LexisNexis
 Ron Mock, Retired President & CEO Ontario Teachers’ Pension Plan
 Claude LeBlanc, President & CEO of Ambac Financial Group Inc.
 M. Marianne Harris, Director at Loblaw Companies and Sun Life Financial, Former Managing Director and President, Corporate and Investment Banking for Merrill Lynch Canada Inc.
 Robert Charles Wong, Former Member of the Legislative Assembly of Ontario
 Angela Brown, President and Chief Executive Officer Moneris Solutions Corporation
 Iqwinder Gaheer, Member of Parliament for Mississauga—Malton
 Alan G. McNally, Former CEO and Chairman of Harris Bank
 Majid Jowhari, Canadian politician with the Liberal Party of Canada, Member of Parliament for Richmond Hill
 Dennis Fotinos, Former President and CEO of Enwave and Former City of Toronto Councillor for Davenport
 Leslyn Lewis, Member of Parliament for Haldimand—Norfolk
 Yvan Baker, Member of Parliament for Etobicoke Centre
 Philip Lawrence, Member of Parliament for Northumberland—Peterborough South
 John Ruffolo, Founder and Former Chief Executive Officer of OMERS Ventures
 Eillen Mercier, Chancellor of Wilfrid Laurier University, Board member of OTTP, CGI Group, Intact Financial, ING Bank of Canada and Teekay
 Anna M. Ewing, Former Executive VP and CIO at NASDAQ OMX
 Grant Rasmussen, Former President & CEO UBS Canada
 Todd Skinner, President, International TransUnion, Former President and CEO of HSBC Financial Canada
 Jerome Dwight, President & CEO of The Bank of New York Mellon Canada
 Dan Daviau, President & Chief Executive Officer of Canaccord Genuity Group
 Tara Rivers, Caymanian politician, currently the Minister of Financial Services and Home Affairs, and previously the Minister of Education
 Peter John Sloly, Chief of police for the Ottawa Police Service, Former player for Canada men's national soccer team
 Tobias C. Enverga Jr., Canadian senator representing the province of Ontario
 Gerald William Cotten, Founder and CEO of Quadriga Fintech Solutions
 Tony Arrell, Founder and Former CEO of Burgundy Asset Management
 Carol Anne Letheran, Former CEO of the Canadian Olympic Association

Student clubs

There are two student government bodies responsible for the student experience at Schulich. 
 On the undergraduate level, students can participate in annual elections to become representatives in the Undergraduate Business Society (UBS). 
 Graduate students have the same opportunity to be elected as their student body representatives in the Graduate Business Council.

Additionally, students can become members and hold position in various student organizations. Each of these organizations solicits membership from newly admitted students at the Club Fair, which takes place during the first week of classes.

Publications 
The Schulich School of Business releases a quarterly alumni magazine called the Exchange (stylized as exchange).

References

External links
 Schulich School of Business

Business schools in Canada
York University
Siamak Hariri buildings
1966 establishments in Ontario
Educational institutions established in 1966